Susanne F. Yelin (born 1968) is a German physicist specializing in theoretical quantum optics and known for her work in quantum coherence and superradiance. She is a professor of physics at the University of Connecticut, a professor of physics in residence at Harvard University, and vice director of the Max Planck/Harvard Research Center for Quantum Optics.

Education and career
Yelin earned a diploma in physics from the University of Stuttgart in 1994, and completed her doctorate (Dr. rer. nat.) from the Ludwig Maximilian University of Munich in 1998 while also working as a visiting student researcher at Texas A&M University.

After postdoctoral research at the Massachusetts Institute of Technology, Center for Astrophysics  Harvard & Smithsonian, and Solid State Scientific Corporation, she joined the University of Connecticut faculty in 2002. She has also been a research affiliate at the Center for Astrophysics  Harvard & Smithsonian since 2002, and joined Harvard University as a senior research fellow in 2010.

Recognition
Yelin was one of three 2013 winners of the Willis E. Lamb Award for Laser Science and Quantum Optics, "for pioneering contributions to the theory of coherence phenomena ranging from super-radiance to ultra-cold molecules".

In 2017 she was named a Fellow of the American Physical Society (APS), after a nomination from the APS Division of Atomic, Molecular & Optical Physics, "for pioneering theoretical work with quantum coherences, such as near-resonant nonlinear quantum optics, for work with hybrid systems, such as molecular and solid state materials, and for work with many-body and cooperative systems and super-radiance".

In 2021 Yelin was named a Fellow of Optica for "pioneering work in theoretical quantum optics with atoms, molecules, and condensed matter, with many-body, nonlinear, and cooperative systems."

References

External links
Home page

1968 births
Living people
20th-century German physicists
German women physicists
21st-century American physicists
American women physicists
University of Stuttgart alumni
Ludwig Maximilian University of Munich alumni
University of Connecticut faculty
Fellows of the American Physical Society
American women academics
21st-century American women scientists